George Robertson (born 19 December 1958) is a British bobsledder. He competed in the four man event at the 1988 Winter Olympics.

References

External links
 

1958 births
Living people
British male bobsledders
Olympic bobsledders of Great Britain
Bobsledders at the 1988 Winter Olympics
Sportspeople from Oxford